USS Pipestone (AK-203) was an  that was constructed for the US Navy during the closing period of World War II. By the time she was scheduled for commissioning, the war’s end caused her to be declared “excess to needs” and she was returned to the US Government and struck by the Navy.

Construction
Pipestone was laid down under US Maritime Commission (MARCOM) contract, MC hull 2157, by Globe Shipbuilding Co., Superior, Wisconsin. She was transferred to the Navy in April 1945. Pipestone was scheduled for commissioning. However, because of the Allied victory in the Pacific Ocean theatre of operations, her commissioning was delayed.

Merchant service
Pipestone was ordered returned to MARCOM for disposal. Her name subsequently reverted to Coastal Explorer.

Coastal Explorer was used by a couple of shipping companies from 1945–1946, before being sold to the government of the Republic of Peru for $693,862.

On 20 February 1947, she was sold to the Peru. She was operated by Corperacion Peruana e Vapores, Callao, Peru, and renamed Putumayo. In 1968 she was sold to Naviera Panamar S.A., also of Callao, and renamed Felipe.

She was eventually sold to Gold Shipping S.A., Panama, and finally sold for scrapping to Spanish shipbreakers in 1974.

Notes 

Citations

Bibliography 

Online resources

External links

 

Alamosa-class cargo ships
Ships built in Superior, Wisconsin
1945 ships
World War II auxiliary ships of the United States
Pipestone County, Minnesota